is a surrealistic side-scrolling beat-'em-up developed by Winds and published by Virgin Interactive Entertainment for the Super Famicom in 1995 only in Japan.

On January 30, 2018, the game was re-released by BlazePro/ Piko Interactive. In addition, Piko Interactive created and published a US SNES cartridge in 2019, for the first time with a full official English translation, titled Gourmet Warriors.

Gameplay

Each of the five stages has a time limit; players lose all the ingredients that were acquired when the timer reaches zero. However, the game has no concept of how many lives the player can have in the game; it's an automatic game over if the player dies. Focusing on the time limit is important if the player wants to recuperate his lost strength after the fight with the level's boss. One of the game's notable features is that a button is used to make the character use various sentai poses when held down and used with the directional pad; while it is not beneficial, this was added to make the character flex his or her muscles for show.

Plot
In the year 20XX, the metropolis known as Zeus Heaven Magic City has made a miraculous recovery from the fires of a nuclear World War III. In order for you to survive in this city of power and technology, it is necessary to ingest protein in whatever food that can be found. The secret organization Bath is a force that grows and expands every day, causing strife and of violent crime throughout the city. Zeus is in danger of ruin as the forces of Bath were constantly instilling their will upon the city by force. Zeus' leaders, however, have launched a secret project that gives them optimism on the prospect of defending the city against Bath. The project looks to enhance and to create a soldier wearing the special body armor, the strongest of the strongest body armor. From this project the conception of the idea to modify the human body was conceived, and three humans: Bonjour, Mademoiselle, and Très Bien have been transformed into fighting machines.

Reception
Retro Gamer gave it an overall score of 79%, advising one "should at least emulate it or watch the couple of game-play videos someone posted on YouTube. If you can stomach Choaniki – or even enjoy it – then this should be right up your alley." GamesRadar played the game on YouTube in the Freaky RadarPlays series and Le Monde featured it in Retro & Magic.

Notes

References

External links 
 Gurume Sentai Barayarō at GameFAQs
 Gurume Sentai Barayarō at Giant Bomb
 

1995 video games
Multiplayer and single-player video games
Piko Interactive games
Post-apocalyptic video games
Science fiction video games
Side-scrolling beat 'em ups
Super Nintendo Entertainment System games
Super Nintendo Entertainment System-only games
Video games developed in Japan
Video games featuring female protagonists
Video games set in the 21st century
Virgin Interactive games